Pierre-Noël-Joseph Foucard, M.E.P. or Pierre-Noël-Joseph Foucart (1830–1889) (Chinese: 富于道) was a Roman Catholic prelate who served as Prefect Apostolic of Kuamsi (1878–1889) and Titular Bishop of Zela (1878–1889).

Biography
Pierre-Noël-Joseph Foucard was born in Olivet, France on 24 December 1830 and ordained a priest in the La Société des Missions Etrangères.
On 13 August 1878, he was appointed during the papacy of Pope Leo XIII as Prefect Apostolic of Kuamsi and Titular Bishop of Zela.
On 23 March 1879, he was consecrated bishop by François-Eugène Lions, Titular Bishop of Basilinopolis. 
He served as Prefect Apostolic of Kuamsi until his death on 31 March 1889.

While bishop, he was the principal consecrator of Augustin Chausse, Coadjutor Prefect of Kouangtong and Titular Bishop of Capsus (1881).

References

External links
 (Chronology of Bishops)
<small> (Chronology of Bishops)

19th-century Roman Catholic bishops in China
Bishops appointed by Pope Leo XIII
1830 births
1889 deaths
Paris Foreign Missions Society missionaries
Paris Foreign Missions Society bishops
19th-century French Roman Catholic bishops